Thomas Henry Delaney (September 14, 1889 – December 16, 1963) was an American blues and jazz songwriter, pianist and singer, who wrote a number of popular songs, mainly in the 1920s. His work was recorded by many of the more fashionable singers and musicians of the period and later times, including Lillyn Brown, Lucille Hegamin, Original Dixieland Jass Band, Ethel Waters, Earl Hines, Count Basie, Bix Beiderbecke, Big Joe Williams, Clara Smith, Alberta Hunter, Clarence Williams, James P. Johnson,   Woody Herman, Bukka White, Toots Thielemans, and Dinah Washington.

Delaney was known primarily as a songwriter for other performers, but he also recorded a small number of his own songs.

Biography
He was born in Charleston, South Carolina. He spent his childhood in orphanages, including the Jenkins Orphanage in Charleston, where he got his first experience of music and formed the Springfield Minstrels. He later toured the East Coast in a song and dance duo billed as Mitchell and Delaney.

One of Delaney's earliest compositions, "Jazz Me Blues", published in 1921, became one of his more durable works. Lucille Hegamin recorded it that year and it went on to become a jazz standard. In the same year, "The Down Home Blues", recorded by Ethel Waters with Delaney accompanying on the piano, became her first hit. It reached number 5 on the U.S. chart. Delaney also became Waters's manager.

His 1923 composition "Sinful Blues" was one of several of Delaney's that became under the influence of the record producer and publicist Joe Davis. Consequently, many subsequent recordings list Perry Bradford as the songwriter, although Delaney did remain the accredited composer for Maggie Jones's "If I Lose, Let Me Lose (Mamma Don't Mind)" and Clara Smith's "Troublesome Blues" (1927). Helen Gross's 1924 rendition of Delaney's "I Wanna Jazz Some More" became more notable for his rhyming lyric "Miss Susan Green from New Orleans." A number of Delaney's songs were not published at all, such as "Goopher Dust Blues" (with the deliberate or unintended error in spelling) and "Grievin' Mama." His "All the Girls Like Big Dick" was too risque a title for release in the 1920s, despite a loosening of morals in that period, but was published by Davis in the 1950s.

In 1929, Delaney composed "Down on Pennsylvania Avenue", with the lyrics "Now if you want good lovin' and want it cheap, just drop around about the middle of the week, when the broad is broke and can't pay rent, get good lovin' boys, for 15 cents." It was one of only four songs recorded by Bertha Idaho. There is some confusion about whether Delaney or Clarence Williams provided the piano accompaniment on Idaho's recordings.

Delaney's own recorded work amounts to two singles, both recorded in New York and released by Columbia Records in 1922: "Bow Legged Mama" backed with "Parson Jones (You Ain't Livin' Right)" and "I'm Leavin' Just to Ease My Worried Mind" backed with "Georgia Stockade Blues".

Delaney's version of his song "Georgia Stockade Blues" is included on the 1999 compilation album Broke, Black and Blue: An Anthology of Blues Classics and Rarities.

Death
Delaney died of atherosclerosis in December 1963, at the age of 74, in Baltimore, Maryland.

Selected songs

References

External links
“Everybody wants to go to heaven, but nobody wants to die.” - Origins of the saying
 The Jazz Me Blues performed by Joe Biviano and his Accordion Rhythm Sextette including John Serry Sr. (accordion), Angello Dellaira (accordion), Tony Mottola (guitar) on archive.org

1889 births
1963 deaths
African-American male songwriters
American blues singers
American blues pianists
American male pianists
American jazz pianists
American jazz songwriters
Songwriters from South Carolina
Musicians from Charleston, South Carolina
American male jazz musicians
20th-century American pianists
African-American pianists
20th-century African-American male singers